The 24th GLAAD Media Awards was the 2013 annual presentation of the GLAAD Media Awards, presented by GLAAD honoring the 2012 season. The awards honored films, television shows, musicians and works of journalism that fairly and accurately represent the LGBT community and issues relevant to the community. The 24th Annual GLAAD Media Awards honored 153 nominees in 25 English-language categories and eight Spanish-language categories.

Awards were presented in three separate ceremonies: in New York City on March 16, 2013, in Los Angeles on April 20, 2013 and in San Francisco on May 11, 2013.

Winners and nominees
Winners are presented in bold.

English-language categories
{| class="wikitable sortable"
|-
! Award
! Winners and nominees
|-
! scope="row" | Outstanding Film - Wide Release
|
The Perks of Being a Wallflower
The Best Exotic Marigold Hotel
Cloud Atlas
ParaNorman
Your Sister's Sister
|-
! scope="row" | Outstanding Film - Limited Release
| 
Any Day Now
Keep the Lights On
Mosquita y Mari
Musical Chairs
North Sea Texas
|-
! scope="row" | Outstanding Drama Series
| 
Smash
Degrassi: The Next Generation
Grey's Anatomy
The L.A. Complex
True Blood
|-
! scope="row" | Outstanding Comedy Series
|
The New Normal
Glee
Go On
Happy Endings
Modern Family
|-
! scope="row" |Outstanding Individual Episode (in a series without a regular LGBT character)
| 
"Don't Ask, Don't Tell Me What to Do" of Raising Hope
"Family Matters" of Drop Dead Diva
"L'Affaire Du Coeur" of Franklin & Bash
"Lost and Found" of Touch
"Ruby Slippers" of The Mentalist
|-
! scope="row" |Outstanding TV Movie or Mini-Series
|
American Horror Story: Asylum
Hit & Miss
Political Animals
|-
! scope="row" |Outstanding Documentary
|
How to Survive a Plague
Wish Me Away
Codebreaker
Hit So Hard
Vito
|-
! scope="row" |Outstanding Reality Program
|
The Amazing Race
"It Is What It Is" of Here Comes Honey Boo Boo"Welcome to Hollywood!" of Pregnant in Heels
Small Town Security
The Real L Word
|-
! scope="row" |Outstanding Talk Show Episode
|"At Home with Neil Patrick Harris, His Fiancé David Burtka, & Their Twins" of Oprah's Next Chapter"Autoshop Restores Bullied Gay Student's Car for Free" of The Ellen DeGeneres Show
"Bishop Gene Robinson" of The Daily Show
"Marriage Equality" of The Suze Orman Show
"The Husband Who is Now a Woman and the Daughter Who is Now a Son" of The Jeff Probst Show
|-
! scope="row" |Outstanding Daily Drama
|Days of Our LivesThe Bold and the Beautiful

|-
! scope="row" |Outstanding TV Journalism - News Magazine
|"Being Transgender in America" of Melissa Harris-Perry
"Almost Equal" of Chronicle
"End of an Error" of The Rachel Maddow Show
"Golden Star" of Rock Center with Brian Williams
"The Last Closet" of Real Sports with Bryant Gumbel
|-
! scope="row" |Outstanding TV Journalism Segment
|"Obama Endorses Marriage Equality" of Good Morning America
"Civil Rights Icon Supports Gay Marriage" of CNN Newsroom
"Controversial Pastor Preaches Against Gays" of Anderson Cooper 360°
"Matthew Mitcham Olympics Profile" of Olympics on NBC
"Scout Mom Dismissed" of MSNBC Live
|-
! scope="row" |Outstanding Newspaper Article
|"Game Changer" by Andy Mannix, City Pages"Black Church Reaches Out to Gay, Transgender Teens" by Meghan E. Irons, The Boston Globe
"Generation Halsted" (series), Windy City Times
"Most Local School Districts Ignore State's Anti-Gay Bullying Law" by Phillip Zonkel, Press-Telegram
"Turned Away, He Turned to the Bible" by Douglas Quenqua, The New York Times
|-
! scope="row" |Outstanding Newspaper Columnist
|Frank Bruni, The New York TimesBill Nemitz, Portland Press Herald
Leonard Pitts, The Miami Herald
Eugene Robinson, The Washington Post
Dan Rodricks, The Baltimore Sun
|-
! scope="row" |Outstanding Newspaper Overall Coverage
|The Boston GlobeThe Baltimore Sun
Portland Press Herald
Sioux City Journal
USA Today
|-
! scope="row" |Outstanding Magazine Article
|"School of Hate" by Sabrina Rubin Erdely, Rolling Stone"The First Gay President" by Andrew Sullivan, Newsweek
"The Marriage Plot: Inside This Year's Epic Campaign for Gay Equality" by Molly Ball, The Atlantic
"Netherland" by Rachel Aviv, The New Yorker
"The Transgender Athlete" by Pablo S. Torre and David Epstein, Sports Illustrated
|-
! scope="row" |Outstanding Magazine Overall Coverage
|The Advocate/OutNew York
The New Yorker
People
Seventeen
|-
! scope="row" |Outstanding Digital Journalism Article
|"Why Aren't We Fighting for CeCe McDonald?" by Marc Lamont Hill, Ebony.com
"The Beautiful Daughter: How My Korean Mother Gave Me the Courage to Transition" by Andy Marra, HuffingtonPost.com
"Boardroom Battle: Directors Clash Over Gay Rights" by Ryan Ruggiero, CNBC.com
"Eight Months in Solitary" by Andrew Harmon, Advocate.com
"Workplace Protections for LGBT Workers Remain Stalled" by Chris Geidner, BuzzFeed.com
|-
! scope="row" |Outstanding Digital Journalism - Multimedia
|"Edie Takes on DOMA" In the Life, ITLMedia.org
"The Advocate 45" (series), Advocate.com
"Athletes at Core of 'Fearless' Photo Project" by Patrick Dorsey and Jeff Sheng, ESPN.com
"'Don't Ask, Don't Tell': Transgender Officers on Secretly Serving in the U.S. Military" by Marc Lamont Hill, Live.HuffingtonPost.com
"Gay Rights in the US, State by State", GuardianNews.com
|-
! scope="row" |Outstanding Blog
|Rod 2.0Autostraddle
blac(k)ademic
The New Civil Rights Movement
Towleroad
|-
! scope="row" |Outstanding Music Artist
|Adam Lambert, Trespassing (tie)Frank Ocean, Channel Orange (tie)
Gossip, A Joyful Noise
Scissor Sisters, Magic Hour
Rufus Wainwright, Out of the Game
|-
! scope="row" |Outstanding Comic Book
|Kevin Keller by Dan Parent, Archie Comics
Astonishing X-Men by Marjorie Liu, Marvel Comics
Batwoman by J.H. Williams III and W. Haden Blackman, DC Comics
Buffy the Vampire Slayer by Andrew Chambliss, Scott Allie, Jane Espenson, Drew Z. Greenberg, Dark Horse Comics
Earth 2 by James Robinson, DC Comics
|-
! scope="row" |Outstanding Los Angeles Theatre
|The Children by Michael ElyanowEdith Can Shoot Things and Hit Them by A. Rey Pamatmat
The Irish Curse by Martin Casella
Pieces by Chris Phillips
Silent by Pat Kinevane
|-
! scope="row" |Outstanding New York Theatre: Broadway and Off-Broadway
|The Whale by Samuel D. HunterBring It On: The Musical Book by Jeff Whitty, music and lyrics by Lin-Manuel Miranda, Tom Kitt and Amanda Green
Cock by Mike Bartlett
The Columnist by David Auburn
Vanya and Sonia and Masha and Spike by Christopher Durang
|-
! scope="row" |Outstanding New York Theatre: Off-Off Broadway
|From White Plains written by Michael Perlman in collaboration with Fault Line TheatreBaby Daddy by Alec Mapa
A Map of Virtue by Erin Courtney
Sontag: Reborn adapted by Moe Angelos, based on the book by Susan Sontag
Tail! Spin! created by Mario Correa
|}

Spanish-language categories

HonoreesVito Russo Award: Anderson CooperAdvocate for Change Award: President Bill ClintonStephen F. Kolzak Award: Steve Warren (attorney)Davidson/Valentini Award:''' Adam Lambert

Notes

References

24th
GLAAD
2013 in California
2013 in LGBT history
2013 in New York City
2013 in Los Angeles
2013 in San Francisco
Lists of LGBT-related award winners and nominees